Touch Nol (born 3 January 1941) is a Cambodian boxer. He competed in the men's light welterweight event at the 1964 Summer Olympics. At the 1964 Summer Olympics, he defeated Brian Anderson of Ireland, before losing to Eddie Blay of Ghana.

References

External links
 

1941 births
Living people
Cambodian male boxers
Olympic boxers of Cambodia
Boxers at the 1964 Summer Olympics
Place of birth missing (living people)
Light-welterweight boxers